Miller High Life 400 may refer to:

 Miller High Life 400 (Spring Richmond), from 1984 to 1987, now the Toyota Owners 400
 Miller High Life 400 (Michigan), in 1984 and from 1988 to 1989, now the FireKeepers Casino 400
 Miller High Life 400 (Fall Richmond), from 1988 to 1989, now the Federated Auto Parts 400

See also
 Miller 400 (disambiguation)
 Miller Genuine Draft 400 (disambiguation)